Josh Larsen (born 4 April 1994) is a Canadian rugby union player who plays for the New England Free Jacks in Major League Rugby (MLR). His usual position is Lock in the second row. 

Larsen previously played for Austin Elite in the MLR and New Zealand team Otago in the Mitre 10 Cup. He also played for Northland and Taieri RFC.

Personal life
Larsen was born in Nanaimo to a New Zealand-born father and Canadian mother. He is the brother of Travis Larsen who also plays rugby.

Club statistics

References

External links
ESPN Profile

1994 births
Living people
Austin Gilgronis players
Canadian expatriate rugby union players
Canadian expatriate sportspeople in the United States
Canada international rugby union players
Canadian people of New Zealand descent
Expatriate rugby union players in the United States
New England Free Jacks players
Rugby union locks
Sportspeople from Nanaimo
Canadian rugby union players
Northland rugby union players
Otago rugby union players